The women's long jump events were held at the 2021 World Para Athletics European Championships in Bydgoszcz, Poland.

Medalists

See also
List of IPC world records in athletics

References

Long jump
2021 in women's athletics
Long jump at the World Para Athletics European Championships